Governor Byng may refer to:

Robert Byng (18th-century MP) (1703–1740), Governor of Barbados from 1739 to 1740
George Byng, 7th Viscount Torrington (1812–1884), Governor of Ceylon from 1847 to 1850
John Byng (1704–1757), Commodore-Governor of Newfoundland Colony in 1742